Hamilton Hume (19 June 1797 – 19 April 1873) was an early explorer of the present-day Australian states of New South Wales and Victoria.  In 1824, along with William Hovell, Hume participated in an expedition that first took an overland route from Sydney to Port Phillip (near the site of present-day Melbourne).  Along with Sturt in 1828, he was part of an expedition of the first Europeans to find the Darling River.

Background
Hume was born on 19 June 1797 in Seven Hills, near Parramatta, a settlement close to (and now a suburb of) Sydney. He was the eldest son of Andrew Hamilton Hume and his wife Elizabeth, née Kennedy. Andrew Hume got the appointment of Commissary-General for New South Wales, and came out to the colony in 1797. Hamilton Hume received most of his education from his mother.

Exploratory career

Early exploration
When Hume was only 17 years of age, he began exploring the country beyond Sydney with his younger brother John and an Aboriginal boy as far to the south-west as Berrima, and soon developed into a good bushman. In 1817, Hume went on a journey with James Meehan, the deputy surveyor-general, and Charles Throsby during which Lake Bathurst and the Goulburn Plains were sighted. Subsequently, in 1818, he went with John Oxley and Meehan to Jervis Bay.

In 1822, he journeyed with Alexander Berry down the south coast of New South Wales. He travelled as far south as the Clyde River, and inland nearly as far as Braidwood.  Berry came to settle in the Shoalhaven, and in June 1822 he left Hume and a party of convicts to cut a 209-yard canal between the Shoalhaven River and the Crookhaven River to allow passage of boats into the Shoalhaven. This canal was Australia's first navigable canal, and the work was completed in 12 days. The canal today forms the main water flow of the Shoalhaven River.

Hume and Hovell expedition

In 1824, Hume was seen by Governor Brisbane with reference to an expedition to Spencer Gulf. Brisbane was also in touch about this time with William Hovell on the same subject, but it is not quite clear which of the men was the first to be approached. In any event, the hoped-for government funding of the expedition was not forthcoming, so that eventually the two men decided to make the journey at their own expense, except for some packsaddles, arms, clothes and blankets, which were provided from government stores.

Hume, in a letter dated 24 January 1825, (immediately after the return of the explorers), practically claimed to have been the leader of the party. He refers to "the expedition your Excellency was pleased to entrust to my care". But Brisbane did not accept this view of it, as in a letter to the secretary, Wilmot Horton, dated 24 March 1825 he mentions the "discovery of new and valuable country . . . by two young men Messrs Hovell and Hume . . . they were directed by me to try and reach Spencer's Gulf". It may also be pointed out that in the letter to Brisbane of 28 July 1824, Hovell signed first. These facts are of interest in view of the controversy which broke out many years later.

Each of the explorers brought three assigned servants with him and between them they had five bullocks, three horses and two carts. Much of the journey was through difficult mountain country, and the party had to cross the major Murrumbidgee River, Murray River, Mitta Mitta River, Ovens River, and Goulburn River. Hovell had named the Murray River after Hume during the trip but Charles Sturt altered it to its current name in 1830.

Four days after crossing the Goulburn impassable country was reached. The party spent three days attempting to cross the Great Dividing Range at Mt Disappointment but were thwarted. Hume shifted direction to the West then reached lower land at the future township of Broadford on the 12 December where they camped.
Hume headed towards low ranges to the South and found a pass in that direction next day. He led the party across the Dividing Range at Hume’s Pass, Wandong and on the 16th December, 1824 reached Port Phillip Bay at Bird Rock, Point Lillias adjacent to the future Geelong.
Hovell claimed that he measured their longitude on the same day but in reality he read it off the sketch map that he and Hume had drafted themselves during the trip.
Hovell admitted in 1867 that he did not take any longitude measurements and blamed Hume for it.
Prior to this admission, Dr William Bland, who wrote the first book on the journey in 1831, invented the myth that Hovell made an error of one degree in longitude in order to protect him.

The party turned back towards New South Wales on the 18 December. Hume chose to travel more to the west to avoid the mountainous country and save considerable time. On 16 January 1825, just as their flour ran out, they reached the carts they had left behind them, and then two days later the safety of Hume's station at Gunning.

This expedition was the first to discover an overland route from southern New South Wales to Port Phillip, on whose shores Melbourne now stands.

Blue Mountains and Lithgow Valley 
In 1827, accompanied by Lieutenant George M. C. Bowen, then an assistant surveyor, Hume explored the western part of the Blue Mountains—around the landform that he named the Darling Causeway, after Governor Ralph Darling—and found three passes through the western escarpment that would have avoided the steep Mt York route. During this period, he named the Lithgow Valley, after William Lithgow, who, at the time, was the Auditor-General of New South Wales.

Exploration of the Darling River

In November 1828, Hume journeyed with Charles Sturt into western New South Wales, where they found the Darling River, the Murray River's longest tributary. Hume was able to communicate with some Aboriginals they met early in their journey who consented to act as guides, and later, when the Aboriginals left them, Sturt speaks with appreciation of Hume's ability in tracking their animals which had strayed. Being a drought year, it was a constant struggle to find water, and only good bushmanship saved the party. Sturt would have liked Hume to go with him on his second expedition, which started at the end of 1829, but he had a harvest to get in and was unable to make arrangements. Hume had finished his work as an explorer, and spent his remaining days as a successful pastoralist.

Later life

Hume married Elizabeth Dight on 8 November 1825 at St Philip's Church in Sydney. She survived him but had no children.

Hume served as a magistrate in Yass until his death at his residence, Cooma Cottage in Yass on 19 April 1873. A double seater buggy once owned by Hume and used by him in Yass is in the National Museum of Australia collection in Canberra.

Honours

Hume is commemorated by the Hume Highway, the principal road between Sydney and Melbourne. Hume and Hovell were also commemorated by having their portraits printed on the Australian one-pound banknote between 1953 and 1966. Hume Dam and the impounded reservoir, Lake Hume, were named in his honour in 1996. The Canberra suburb of Hume was named after him, as was the federal electoral Division of Hume. The City of Hume, an outer metropolitan council in Melbourne formed in 1994, is named in his honour.

In 1976 a postage stamp bearing the portraits of Hume and Hovell was issued by Australia Post. The Hume and Hovell Track, a  trail between Yass and Albury, also bears their joint names.

See also
 Hume and Hovell expedition

Notes

The Story of John Byrne, Freeman's Journal Thursday 11 June 1908, p. 32

References

External links
 Cooma Cottage, Yass – Hume's home from 1839
 National Museum of Australia Hume's double-seater buggy.

1797 births
1873 deaths
Australian explorers
Explorers of Australia
People from Sydney
Australian people of Scottish descent
Hume Highway